Marcus Bierich (29 April 1926 in Hamburg - 25 November 2000 in Stuttgart) was CFO for Mannesmann AG from 1961 to 1980 (what became Vodafone) in Düsseldorf; CFO for Allianz AG from 1980 to 1984 in Munich; CEO for Robert Bosch GmbH 1984-1993 and Chairman of the Advisory Board until his death in 2000 in Stuttgart.

Education
School: Johanneum in Hamburg;
Studies: Philosophy and Mathematics in Hamburg and Münster;
Doctorate: Freges 'Lehre von dem Sinn und der Bedeutung der Urteile' und Russels Kritik an dieser Lehre in 1951;
apprentice: Delbrück, Schickler & Co., private Bankers in Berlin;
Honorable Doctorate in economics from Ruhruniversität Bochum in 1977;
Honorable Senator to the Universität Tübingen in 1988

References

 http://www.bosch-presse.de/presseforum/details.htm?txtID=4966

Businesspeople from Hamburg
Commanders Crosses of the Order of Merit of the Federal Republic of Germany
2000 deaths
1926 births